İsmailcan Dörtkardeş (born 7 August 1995, Fatih), better known as XANTARES, is a Turkish professional Counter-Strike: Global Offensive player for Eternal Fire. He had previously played for Turkish Space Soldiers and German BIG Clan.

Early and personal life 
İsmailcan Dörtkardeş was born on 7 August 1995 in Fatih, Istanbul. In a 2016 interview with Sabah, Dörtkardeş explained that his future teammates had to convince his parents to let him sign the contract that they all got offered by Space Soldiers. On 13 July 2021, he underwent a hand surgery to prevent sweating.

Career

Space Soldiers (2015–2018) 
Dörtkardeş joined Space Soldiers when it formed on 17 January 2015. In October 2016, the Turkish National CS:GO Team consisting of Dörtkardeş and other Space Soldiers players won the World Championship 2016 after beating Argentina in the grand final. In September 2017, Space Soldiers qualified for ESL One Cologne 2017. In the first match, the team beat SK Gaming, the number 1 ranked team at the time.

On 13 October 2018, all players parted their ways with Space Soldiers. After the release of the roster, it was speculated that the players would join SK Gaming. This speculation was shut down by Dörtkardeş on Twitch.

BIG Clan (2018–2021) 
On 22 December 2018, Dörtkardeş joined an international team for the first time by signing with Germany-based BIG Clan. He left ex-Space Soldiers due to "internal and internet issues within the team". Dörtkardeş played as an entry-fragger for the team. During a Twitch stream the next month, he revealed that he got offers from FaZe Clan and Mousesports, before joining BIG.

In July 2020, BIG Clan won cs_summit 6 Europe, winning 2–1 against Team Vitality in the grand-final. During the tournament, BIG also notably defeated FaZe Clan 2–0 early on, with ESPN Brazil saying that Dörtkardeş gave "FaZe a lot of headache" during the match. The team was ranked as the best team in the world that month by HLTV.

On 30 September 2020, Dörtkardeşextended his contract with the team until the end of 2021. He was banned from Twitch in June 2021 for the second time. On 5 August 2021, Dörtkardeş was listed for transfer by BIG. He was released from his contract later on 13 August.

Eternal Fire (2021–present) 
On 13 August 2021, it was announced that Dörtkardeş would join the newly-formed Eternal Fire with a majority-Turkish line-up. In April 2022, the team qualified for the PGL Major Antwerp 2022. They got eliminated by Made in Brazil in the Challengers stage.

Honours

Space Soldiers 
 GeForce Cup 2017.
 WESG 2017 World Finals
 DreamHack Open Austin 2018

BIG Clan 
 ELEAGUE Invitational 2019
 DreamHack Masters Spring 2020 Europe
 cs_summit 6 Europe
 DreamHack Open Summer 2020 (MVP)

References 

Counter-Strike players
1995 births
Living people